Heterogynis rifensis is a moth in the Heterogynidae family. It was described by Josef J. de Freina in 2003.

References

Heterogynidae
Moths described in 2003